Johanna Maria "Annemarie" Penn-te Strake (born 31 July 1953) is a Dutch jurist and politician. She has been mayor of Maastricht since 1 July 2015.

Education and career 
Penn-te Strake grew up in Deurne and studied law at the Radboud University Nijmegen. She worked as a judge and as a public prosecutor in the Court of Maastricht. Until being elected as a mayor she was working as an Attorney General for the Public Prosecution Service in The Hague. She does not have any political party affiliation.

Personal life 
Penn-te Strake is married to Olaf Penn who is a retired surgeon. He resigned from his position as a chairman of the Senior Party Maastricht in 2015.

References

1953 births
Living people
20th-century Dutch judges
21st-century Dutch judges
21st-century Dutch politicians
21st-century Dutch women politicians
Dutch prosecutors
Dutch women jurists
Independent politicians in the Netherlands
Mayors of Maastricht
People from Deurne, Netherlands
People from Helmond
Radboud University Nijmegen alumni